Paszport (English: Passport) is a 2001 Hungarian film  directed by Péter Gothár. It was nominated for European Film Awards in two categories: Best Director and Best Cinematography.

Story
The story of the film begins in the early 1990s in Hungary. Jözsi (Gergely Kocsis) sets out from there to go to the Ukraine to marry and bring home the half-Hungarian Elizaveta (Enikö Börcsök). They could become each other's passport to their upcoming lives.

Awards and nominations
European Film Award for Best Director - Péter Gothár (nominated)
European Film Award for Best Cinematography - (nominated)

References

External links

2000s Hungarian-language films
2001 films